The 1922 All England Championships was a badminton tournament held at the Royal Horticultural Hall, Westminster, England from 7 March to 12 March 1922. Archibald Engelbach played under the alias Archibald Fee.

Sir George Thomas successfully defended the men's singles title for a third consecutive year as did Kitty McKane in the women's singles. Thomas and Hazel Hogarth secured a fourth consecutive mixed doubles title (the first won in 1914) and if it was not for the war years the number would surely have been much higher.

Irishman Frank Devlin became the first official overseas winner of a Championship title when winning the men's doubles with Guy Sautter. An Irish pair had won a non-Championship event during the 1902 All England Badminton Championships and Sautter himself was a Swiss/English dual national when winning events but played internationally for England during those events. The final event the women's doubles was won by Hogarth and Margaret Tragett.

Final results

Men's singles

Women's singles

Men's doubles

Women's doubles

Mixed doubles

References

All England Open Badminton Championships
All England
All England Open Badminton Championships in London
All England Badminton Championships
All England Badminton Championships
All England Badminton Championships